Gordon Edwynn Hunt (April 26, 1929 – December 17, 2016) was an American writer, director and actor who worked in television, film, theatre and voice work. 

He directed such animated productions as The Jetsons, Scooby-Doo, Super Friends, The Richie Rich Show, The Smurfs, Pound Puppies, Tom & Jerry Kids, The Pirates of Dark Water, Droopy, Master Detective and The New Adventures of Captain Planet.

Early life and career
Hunt was born on Friday, April 26, 1929 in Pasadena, California, the son of Helen F. (née Roberts; originally Rothenberg) and George Smith Hunt II, an industrial designer. He also had a younger half-brother, director and lighting designer Peter H. Hunt. His mother was from a German-Jewish family. His father was from Minnesota, and was a Mayflower descendant, of English origin.

He had been working as a freelance director in New York City before being hired to work at the Mark Taper Forum in Los Angeles, where he served as their casting director for ten years. He was then hired by Joseph Barbera to direct animated series at Hanna-Barbera. His first voice directing job was Partridge Family 2200 A.D. in 1974.

With a prestigious twenty-year career at Hanna-Barbera, Hunt was now prominent in the voiceover forum, where he was a freelance director for multiple animated productions and video games. As a voice actor, he voiced the character of Wally in the animated adaptation of the comic strip Dilbert. He has often worked alongside colleague voice directors Ginny McSwain, Andrea Romano, Kris Zimmerman and Jamie Thomason. McSwain, Romano and Zimmerman had studied under him as animation casting directors and learned the profession from Hunt before becoming voice directors themselves. Andrea Romano considers him to be her mentor, who makes actors feel so comfortable and relaxed that she said, "Nobody does not like Gordon".

He directed many television series, of which most were situation comedies. In 1996, he received the Directors Guild of America Award; "Outstanding Directorial Achievement in Comedy Series" for Mad About Yous episode The Alan Brady Show. Hunt also voice directed multiple video games. Among the games he worked on are Pandemonium, the God of War series, Lair, Final Fantasy XIV, Blur, the Legacy of Kain series, and the Uncharted series. He also served as motion capture director on Uncharted: Golden Abyss.

Personal life
He was the father of actress Helen Hunt from his marriage to photographer Jane Elizabeth Novis; they later divorced. He later married voice actress B.J. Ward in 1995, they remained married until Hunt's death in 2016.

Death
Hunt died in Los Angeles, California, on Saturday, December 17, 2016 of complications from Parkinson's disease at the age of 87.

Filmography

Recording director

Animated specials and films

Animated shorts

Video games

Actor: animated and film roles

References

External links
Official website 

1929 births
2016 deaths
American casting directors
American voice directors
Male actors from Los Angeles
American television directors
American theatre directors
American male voice actors
20th-century American male actors
21st-century American male actors
American people of English descent
American people of German-Jewish descent
People from Pasadena, California
Deaths from Parkinson's disease
Neurological disease deaths in California
Directors Guild of America Award winners
Hanna-Barbera people